Klaus Berger (24 March 1901 - 13 February 2000) was a German art historian and professor at the University of Kansas. He wrote books on Gericault, Odilon Redon and Japonisme.

Selected publications
 Das Problem der Entwicklung in der modernen Kunstwissenschaft. Erster Teil: Wölfflins Formauffassung und ihr Umkreis. Dissertation, Ms.; Auszug in: Jahrbuch der Philosophischen Fakultät Göttingen. 1924, S. 1–12.
 Géricault. Drawings and Watercolors. Bittner, Recklinghausen 1946.
 als Herausgeber: French Master Drawings of the Nineteenth Century. Harper, New York 1950.
 Géricault und Sein Werk. Schroll, Wien 1952 (engl. Übersetzung: Géricault and His Work. University of Kansas Press, Lawrence 1955)
 Odilon Redon. Phantasie und Farben. DuMont Schauberg, Köln 1964 (engl. Übersetzung: Odilon Redon. Fantasy and Colour). Weidenfeld & Nicolson, London 1964.
 Stilstrukturen des 19. Jahrhunderts. In: Zeitschrift für Ästhetik und allgemeine Kunstwissenschaft. NS 12, 1967, S. 192–203 [Festschrift Joseph Gantner].
 Japonismus in der westlichen Malerei 1860–1920. Prestel, München 1980 (engl. Übersetzung: Japonisme in Western Painting from Whistler to Matisse. Cambridge University Press, Cambridge 1992)
 (Übers.) Moritz Geiger: The Significance of Art. A Phenomenological Approach to Aesthetics. Center for Advanced Research in Phenomenology and University Press of America, Lanham 1986 (Übersetzung von M. Geiger: Die Bedeutung der Kunst. Zugänge zu einer materialen Wertästhetik)

References 

1901 births
2000 deaths
Writers from Berlin
German art historians
University of Kansas faculty